William Kingdom (fl. 1840s-50s) was a property developer who was active in the development of tracts of west London in the mid-nineteenth century. These included the Westbourne area where he worked with Thomas Marsh Nelson on Westbourne Terrace, areas north of Craven Road, and most of Gloucester Terrace between 1843 and 1852. He may also have developed Hyde Park Gardens, Paddington.

References 

British builders
Year of birth missing
Year of death missing
19th-century British people
Westbourne, London
Paddington
Tyburnia